Alan Banks (birth registered second  1965) is an English former professional rugby league footballer who played in the 1980s and 1990s.

Background
Alan Banks' birth was registered in Pontefract, West Riding of Yorkshire, England.

Playing career
Banks made his début for Featherstone Rovers on Wednesday 28 April 1982, during his time at Featherstone Rovers he scored two 3-point tries, and forty-five 4-point tries.

Challenge Cup Final appearances
Banks played  in Featherstone Rovers' 14–12 victory over Hull F.C. in the 1983 Challenge Cup Final during the 1982–83 season at Wembley Stadium, London on Saturday 7 May 1983, in front of a crowd of 84,969.

County Cup Final appearances
Banks played , i.e. number 5, in Featherstone Rovers' 14–20 defeat by Bradford Northern in the 1989 Yorkshire County Cup Final during the 1989–90 season at Headingley Rugby Stadium, Leeds on Sunday 5 November 1989.

Genealogical information
Banks is the uncle of the rugby league footballer; Tommy Saxton.

References

External links
Statistics at rugbyleagueproject.org
The Story of Wembley 1983. Part I - a featherstone rovers blog
The Story of Wembley 1983. Part II - a featherstone rovers blog
The Story of Wembley 1983. Part III - a featherstone rovers blog
The Story of Wembley 1983. Part IV - a featherstone rovers blog
The Story of Wembley 1983. Part V - a featherstone rovers blog
The Story of Wembley 1983. Part VI - a featherstone rovers blog
The Story of Wembley 1983. Part VII - a featherstone rovers blog
The Story of Wembley 1983. Part VIII - a featherstone rovers blog
The Story of Wembley 1983. Part IX - a featherstone rovers blog
The Story of Wembley 1983. Part X - a featherstone rovers blog

1965 births
Living people
English rugby league players
Featherstone Rovers players
Rugby league five-eighths
Rugby league players from Pontefract
Rugby league wingers